Robert Cannon may refer to:

 Robert Cannon (athlete) (born 1958), American Olympic athlete
 Robert C. Cannon (1917–2008), American judge, Milwaukee Brewers executive
 Robert Milchrist Cannon (1901–1976), United States Army Lieutenant General